Northern Ndebele, also called Ndebele, isiNdebele saseNyakatho, Zimbabwean Ndebele or North Ndebele, associated with the term Matabele, is a Bantu language spoken by the Northern Ndebele people which belongs to the Nguni group of languages.

As a start and to give some context, Ndebele is a term used to refer to a collection of many different African cultures in Zimbabwe. It perhaps by default became a 'language' (for lack of better word) spoken predominantly by the descendants of Mzilikazi. As a language, it is by no means similar to the Ndebele language spoken in kwaNdebele in South Africa although, like many Nguni dialects, some words will be shared. Many of the natives that were colonized by the Matabele were assimilated into Mzilikazi's kingdom to create a version of isiZulu. The Matebele people of Zimbabwe descend from followers of the Zulu leader Mzilikazi (one of Zulu King Shaka's generals), who left the Zulu Kingdom in the early 19th century, during the Mfecane, arriving in present-day Zimbabwe in 1839.

Although there are some differences in grammar, lexicon and intonation between Zulu and Northern Ndebele, the two languages share more than 85% of their lexicon. To prominent Nguni linguists like Anthony Trevor Cope and Cyril Nyembezi, Northern Ndebele is a dialect of Zulu. To others like Langa Khumalo, it is a language. Distinguishing between a language and a dialect for language varieties that are very similar is difficult, with the decision often being based not on linguistic but on political criteria.

Northern Ndebele and Southern Ndebele (or Transvaal Ndebele), which is spoken in South Africa, are separate but related languages with some degree of mutual intelligibility, although the former is more closely related to Zulu. Southern Ndebele, while maintaining its Nguni roots, has been influenced by the Sotho languages.

Phonology

Consonants 

Many consonant sounds may result in depressed (or breathy) allophones.

Ndebele /t͡ʃ/ generally correspond to Zulu /ʃ/.

Click consonants

In Northern Ndebele, there are fifteen click consonants.

The five clicks spelled with a c  are made by placing the tip of the tongue against the front upper teeth and gums, the centre of the tongue is depressed and the tip of the tongue is drawn backwards. The resulting sound is similar to the sound used in English to express annoyance.
Some examples are cina (end), cela (ask).

The five clicks spelled with a q  are made by raising the back of the tongue to touch the soft palate and touching the gums with the sides and tip of the tongue. The centre of the tongue is depressed and the tip drawn quickly away from the gum. The resulting sound is like the "pop" heard when quickly removing the cork from a bottle.
Some examples are qalisa (start), qeda (finish).

The five clicks spelled with a x  are made by placing the tongue so that the back of the tongue touches the soft palate and the sides and tip of the tongue touch the gums. One side of the tongue is quickly withdrawn from the gums.
Some examples are xoxa (discuss), ixoxo (frog).

Vowels

There are five vowel phonemes, written with the letters a, e, i, o, u.

 a is pronounced , approximately like a in father; e.g. abantwana (children)
 i is pronounced , like ee in see; e.g. siza (help)
 u is pronounced , like oo in soon; e.g. umuntu (person)

Examples
Months in Northern and Southern Ndebele

Grammar
Ndebele grammar is similar to that of Zulu, with some distinct differences. Northern Ndebele is a Nguni language and is to some extent also mutually intelligible with Swati and Xhosa,possesses several click sounds typical of Southern African languages the predominant language in the Eastern Cape.

Nouns

The Northern Ndebele noun consists of two essential parts, the prefix and the stem. Using the prefixes, nouns can be grouped into noun classes, which are numbered consecutively, to ease comparison with other Bantu languages.

The following table gives an overview of Northern Ndebele noun classes, arranged according to singular-plural pairs.

1 umu- replaces um- before monosyllabic stems, e. g. umuntu (person).

Verbs

Verbs are marked with the following prefixes in agreement with the noun class of the subject and the object:

While subject-verb agreement is obligatory, object marking is not, and only appears when the object is given in the discourse. The object marker attaches closer to the verb root when it occurs (with the following notations: A - augment vowel; 1 - class 1 nominal prefix, etc; 1s - class 1 subject agreement, etc; FUT - future; 1o - class 1 object marker, etc):

There is evidence from Zulu that object markers are an evolution of pronominal clitics to be agreement markers, which might also be the case for Northern Ndebele, given the linguistic similarity between the languages.

See also

 Matabele
 Zulu language
 Southern Ndebele language
 Provinces of Zimbabwe
 Matabeleland North
 Matabeleland South
 Bulawayo

References

Further reading

External links

 Northern Ndebele for Beginners
 Speak Ndebele
 The History of the Ndebele People

 
Zulu language
Nguni languages
Languages of Botswana
Languages of Zimbabwe